The Eyes Have It is a Donald Duck animated short film produced in Technicolor by Walt Disney Productions, originally released on March 30, 1945 by RKO Radio Pictures. It was the final Disney short animated by Don Patterson and it was the only short to have his on-screen credit. The last Donald Duck cartoon to feature Pluto, it centers on Donald using hypnosis goggles to turn Pluto into various animal-like states.

Plot
Donald receives a package in the mail containing a hypnosis kit with a pair of goggles. Under instructions that he should select a subject of low intelligence, he decides to test the goggles on Pluto. He hypnotizes Pluto to think he's a variety of animals—a mouse, a turtle, a chicken—and each time Pluto starts behaving like the animal, even partially taking on its form. While in his chicken form he gets into a fight with a rooster, so Donald hypnotizes him to think he's a lion. Pluto becomes ferocious and starts attacking the rooster, and the two run into Donald, inadvertently causing the goggles to shatter. Pluto chases Donald, now unable to control him, back to his house and wrecks much of the place, even destroying the hypnotism manual (which Donald scans in a desperate attempt to turn him back to normal) and all the chairs Donald uses to defend himself. They both end up breaking through the rooftop and running into midair, before plummeting violently to the ground, knocking Donald unconscious and returning Pluto to his normal self. Pluto licks Donald's face to wake him up, but thinking he's still in his lion state, Donald frantically rushes away. Pluto looks toward the camera with a confused expression.

Voice cast
 Clarence Nash as Donald Duck
 Pinto Colvig as Pluto
 Florence Gill as Hen
 Richard Conte as Rooster

Home media
The short was released on December 6, 2005 on Walt Disney Treasures: The Chronological Donald, Volume Two: 1942-1946.

Notes
The title is from divisions of the assembly, a part of parliamentary procedure in which the chairperson ultimately announces either "The ayes have it" or "The nays have it" depending on whether the motion has passed or failed the vote.

See also
 Beach Picnic
 Donald and Pluto
 Window Cleaners

References

External links
 
 

Donald Duck short films
1940s Disney animated short films
1945 animated films
1945 films
Films about hypnosis
Films directed by Jack Hannah
Films produced by Walt Disney